Cavaglio may refer to:

 Cavaglio d'Agogna, municipality in the Province of Novara in the Italian region Piedmont
 Cavaglio-Spoccia, in the Province of Verbano-Cusio-Ossola in the Italian region Piedmont

See also 

 Cavaglia
 Caviglia
 Cavigliano